Pholiota adiposa is a species of fungus in the family Strophariaceae commonly known as the chestnut mushroom. It was originally described by German naturalist August Batsch in 1786 as a species of Agaricus. Paul Kummer transferred it to the genus Pholiota in 1871. It is found in Europe, where it grows both saprophytically and as a weak parasite on living and dead stems of European beech trees.

See also
List of Pholiota species

References

External links

Strophariaceae
Fungi of Europe
Fungi described in 1786
Taxa named by August Batsch